Karl Sanne (26 January 1869 – 29 June 1945) was a Norwegian farmer and politician of the Conservative Party who served as Minister of Education and Church Affairs from 1923 to 1924.

Biography 
He took part in the farm and banking work of his foster father in Vanse, before eventually taking over the farm Bryne and serving as treasurer at Vanse Sogns Sparebank in 1897. He held a number of positions besides his political activity. Sanne was a member of the Supervisory Board of Svelvik and Strøms Sparebank from 1927 to 1937.

Sanne was a member of Vanse chairmanship from 1886 to 1907 and again from 1910 to 1917, deputy mayor of Vanse 1907–1910, member of Lista chairmanship 1918–1919, mayor of Lista 1919–1922 and member of Svelvik city council 1931–1937. For some time, he served as the chairman of the Collective Party's organization in Lister and Mandal county and a member of the Conservative Party central board from 1915. Sanne was elected to the Storting from the Lister constituency Lister and Mandal for the terms 1913–1915 and 1919–1921 and from Vest-Agder 1922–1927. In 1923, he was appointed Minister of Education and Church Affairs following Ivar B. Sælen’s death. He held this post until July 1924, when Prime Minister Abraham Berge resigned.

References

1869 births
1945 deaths
Government ministers of Norway
Ministers of Education of Norway